Pholcus ponticus is a species of cellar spider found from Bulgaria to China.

See also 
 List of Pholcidae species

References

External links 

Pholcidae
Spiders of Europe
Spiders of China
Spiders described in 1875